Trtorići is a village in the municipality of Breza, Bosnia and Herzegovina.

Demographics 
According to the 2013 census, its population was 202.

References

Populated places in Breza, Bosnia and Herzegovina